Apodasmia similis, also known as oioi or jointed wire rush, is a plant that is endemic to New Zealand. It is a coastal plant but is also found around peat bogs and hot springs. It flowers from October to December and bears fruit from December to March.

Importance 
Apodasmia similis, along with Empodisma minus, are the respective host plants of the two species of leafhoppers, Paracephaleus hudsoni and Paracephaleus curtus, native to New Zealand.

See also
Wetlands of New Zealand

References

External links
Oioi at Te Ara: The Encyclopedia of New Zealand
Apodasmia similis at the New Zealand Plant Conservation Network

Flora of New Zealand
Restionaceae
Taxa named by Barbara G. Briggs
Taxa named by Lawrence Alexander Sidney Johnson